Nathan Daboll (November 14, 1780 – August 28, 1863), was an American politician, judge, textbook author, and almanac publisher.

Personal life
He was the son of Elizabeth (1742–1813) and Nathan Daboll (1750–1818).  He had a younger sister, Lydia (born c. 1782).

Daboll married Elizabeth in 1804.  They had a son, David Austin Daboll (1813–1895).

He received an Honorary Degree from Wesleyan University in Middletown, Connecticut in 1835.

Career
Daboll served in the Connecticut House of Representatives 1832–1833, and the Connecticut Senate 1833–1835.

He was Clerk of the Court of Probate for the State of Connecticut, County of New London, Connecticut, Probate District of Stonington before serving as a probate judge 1843–1845.

Daboll assisted his father, the notable American Revolution period almanac publisher, with the publication of the New England Almanac.  With his son David, he developed Daboll's New Arithmetic, a revision of his father's textbook, Schoolmaster's Assistant.

Works

References

1780 births
1863 deaths
People from Groton, Connecticut
Connecticut state senators
Members of the Connecticut House of Representatives
Connecticut state court judges
Writers from Connecticut
Wesleyan University people
19th-century American politicians
19th-century American judges